Supercharger is the fourth studio album by heavy metal band Machine Head. The release was ill-timed, and, as a result of little promotion, fell far short of the success of The Burning Red, which has sold about 134,000 copies in the US to date. Supercharger has sold about 45,000 copies in the US to date, making it a commercial failure. It is the band's last release to feature lead guitarist Ahrue Luster.

Album information
Supercharger was released in October, 2001, just weeks after the 9/11 terrorist attacks. The lead (and only) single "Crashing Around You", was pulled from MTV and rock radio just as soon as it was added despite being the "most added" track in the United States. The pull was a result of the metaphorical "crashing" lyric in the song and the burning San Francisco skyline in the video.

Machine Head's support tour for the album was done without help from their label Roadrunner Records, and after the release of Hellalive to fulfill their contract, led the band to a two-year hiatus from the label's American branch.

With The Burning Red, the band moved their sound more towards contemporary nu metal trends. Supercharger was darker and heavier than The Burning Red, but lacked as much groove metal sound as Burn My Eyes and The More Things Change... Two years later, the band would release Through the Ashes of Empires and return to their groove metal roots.

The album was released in standard and digipak editions, the latter of which contains four previously released bonus tracks.

Reception

The album received mixed to negative reviews.

Track listing

The bonus track on several editions of Supercharger, "Hole in the Sky", originally appeared on Nativity in Black II. The two live tracks on the 18 track digipak were recorded on September 15, 1999 at Webster Hall, Hartford, Connecticut. These live tracks were previously released on the Year of the Dragon EP.

Personnel
Machine Head
 Robb Flynn – vocals, rhythm guitar
 Ahrue Luster – lead guitar
 Adam Duce – bass
 Dave McClain – drums

Technical personnel
Johnny K. – production
Machine Head – Co-production
Colin Richardson – mixing
Johnny K., Kevin Bosley – engineers
Scott Oyster – assistant engineer
Brett Nolan – assistant mix engineer
Ted Jensen – mastering

Hole in the Sky
Colin Richardson – production
Toby Wright – mixing

Live tracks
Machine Head – production
Toby Wright – mixing

Chart positions

References

Machine Head (band) albums
Nu metal albums by American artists
2001 albums
Roadrunner Records albums